Bering (20 March 1983 – 16 December 2011) was a British-bred, French-trained Thoroughbred racehorse. He won five of his seven starts, including the Prix du Jockey Club in 1986. On his final start he finished second to Dancing Brave in the Prix de l'Arc de Triomphe. He was bred and owned by Alec Head, and trained by his daughter Criquette Head. After retiring from racing Bering had some success as a stallion, with his progeny including 2000 Guineas Stakes winner Pennekamp and Poule d'Essai des Poulains winner American Post.

Background
Bering was a chestnut colt bred by Alec Head and foaled in 1983. He was sired by Arctic Tern, who won the Prix Ganay in 1977. His dam was Beaune, a stakes winning daughter of Lyphard.

Racing career

1985: Two-year-old season
In his first Bering finished third in a 1,600 metre race at Longchamp on 5 October 1985. He followed this up a month later by winning a 1,700 metre race at Maisons-Laffitte. He was ridden by Freddy Head on both of his races as a two-year-old.

1986: Three-year-old season
Bering started the 1986 season by winning the Prix Noailles by eight lengths from Point D'Artois in April. In May he then took the Prix Hocquart, again beating Point D'Artois, this timeby two lengths. After these two victories he was sent off as the odds-on favourite for the Prix du Jockey Club over 2,400 metres at Chantilly. Art Francais set off in the lead at a fast past, at one point being ten lengths clear of the rest of the field. As they entered the finishing straight, Pradier took the lead, whilst Bering was moving through into third position. Bering took the lead with about 400 metres left to run and was never caught, winning by one and a half lengths from Altayan. Bering ran the race in a time of 2 minutes and 24.10 seconds, which beat the race record set by Top Ville in 1979 by 1.2 seconds. Gary Moore said after the race "I knew we were going to win 400m-600m out and all he needed was a couple of smacks."

As preparation for the Prix de l'Arc de Triomphe Bering raced in the Prix Niel at Longchamp, which he won by two and a half lengths from Malakim. In his final race Bering took on a strong field in the Prix de l'Arc de Triomphe. He was ridden by Gary Moore, as he had been throughout his three-year-old career. Bering was leading the race well into the closing stages until he was overtaken by Dancing Brave with about 100 metres left to run. Dancing Brave won the race by one and a half lengths from Bering. Bering finished one and a half lengths ahead of Triptych, who just beat Shahrastani for third place.

Assessment
Timeform rated Bering at 136, making him the second highest rated three-year-old of 1986, behind only Dancing Brave (rated 140).

Stud career
After the 1986 season Bering was retired to stud. He initially stood at Walmac International for a fee of $75,000. In 1992 he moved back to France to stand at Haras du Quesnay near Deauville. Bering retired from stud duty in 2009 and died on 16 December 2011, aged 28. At the time of his death he had sired 77 winners of stakes races. His most notable progeny are listed below.

Notable progeny

s = stallion, m = mare, g = gelding

Bering was also the damsire of Harbinger, who in 2010 was rated as the best horse in the world in the World Thoroughbred Racehorse Rankings.

Pedigree

Note: b. = Bay, br. = Brown, ch. = Chestnut

References

1983 racehorse births
2011 racehorse deaths
Racehorses bred in the United Kingdom
Racehorses trained in France
Thoroughbred family 7-f